Ji is the pinyin romanization of a number of distinct Chinese surnames that are written with different characters in Chinese. Depending on the character, it may be spelled Jī, Jí, Jǐ, or Jì when tone diacritics are used. In Wade–Giles they are romanized as Chi. Languages using the Latin alphabet do not distinguish among the different Chinese surnames, rendering them all as Ji or Chi. Chi (池) is also a Chinese surname; it is the surname of Wuhan author Chi Li.

Surnames romanized as Ji

Ancient clan names
Jī 姬 (first tone), Gei or Kei in Cantonese, the royal surname of the Zhou dynasty, the 207th most common surname in modern China
Jí 姞 (second tone), Gat or Kat in Cantonese, the royal surname of the states of Southern Yan (南燕), Mixu (密须), and Bi (偪)
Jǐ 己 (third tone), Gei or Kei in Cantonese, the royal surname of the states of Ju, Tan (郯), and Wen (温)

Other surnames
Jǐ (or Jì) 紀/纪 (third tone (or fourth tone)), Gei or Kei in Cantonese, the 122nd most common surname in China
Jì 季 (fourth tone), Gwai or Kwai in Cantonese, the 142nd most common surname in China
Jí 吉 (second tone), Gat or Kat in Cantonese, the 195th most common surname in China
Jì 冀 (fourth tone), Kei in Cantonese, the 294th most common surname in China
Jī 嵇 (first tone), Kai in Cantonese
Jì 计/計 (fourth tone), Gai or Kai in Cantonese
Jì 蓟/薊 (fourth tone), Gai or Kai in Cantonese
Jì 暨 (fourth tone), Kei in Cantonese
Jí 汲 (second tone), Kap in Cantonese
Jí 籍 (second tone), Zik in Cantonese

See also
Ji (Korean name)
Chi (surname)

References

Chinese-language surnames
Multiple Chinese surnames